Sanpol Sang-Ano (born 27 December 1958) is a Thai boxer. He competed in the men's light flyweight event at the 1984 Summer Olympics.

References

1958 births
Living people
Sanpol Sang-Ano
Sanpol Sang-Ano
Boxers at the 1984 Summer Olympics
Place of birth missing (living people)
Light-flyweight boxers